The de Lalaing family is a noble family from the south of Flanders (Lallaing is currently in France) which played an important role in the history of the County of Hainaut and of the Netherlands. The current family belongs to the Belgian nobility.

History
The first known ancestor is Gerard de Forest who lived in the 11th century. Thanks to the wedding of Philipp of Lalaing, 2nd Count of Hoogstraten to Anne Countess of Renneberg, daughter of William, count of Rennenberg and Anne of Culemborg, their descendants inherited multiple important lands and titles.

Family Tree

Descendants of Othon 

Othon, Lord of Lalaing;Married to Yolande of Barbançon, Lady of Montigny
Simon de Lalaing (1405–1476): Knight of the Golden Fleece.married to Jeanne de Gavre, lady of Escornaix
Joost de Lalaing (-1483): Lord of Montignymarried to Bonne de Viefville
Charles I, 1st Count of Lalaing (1466–1525)married to Jacqueline de Luxembourg 
Charles II, 2nd Count of Lalaing (1506–1558)m.1 Marguerite de Croÿ (1508–1549) m.2 Marie de Montmorency (-1570) 
Philip de Lalaing, 3rd Count of Lalaing:married to Marguerite de Ligne-Arenberg (1552–1611)
Christine of Lalaing;married to Maximillian; count of Bailleul, Baron of Lesdain
Marguerithe of Bailleul:Married to Ambroise de Hornes, count of Bassignies.
Eugene Maximilian, Prince of Hornes
Maria Margaretha de Lalaing (1574–1650) m. Florent of Berlaymont (1550–1626)
Emanuel Philibert de Lalaing (1557–1590) m. Anne de Croÿ (-1608)
Marie-Christine de Lalaing (-1582)m. Pierre de Melun (1594)
Philip de Lalaing, 2nd Count of Hoogstraten (-1555)m. Anna von Rennenberg
Antoine II, 3rd Count of Hoogstraten (1533–1568): see below.
George de Lalaing, Count of Rennenberg; Marquess of Ville (-1581)
Antoine I de Lalaing (1480–1540); 1st Count of Hoogstraeten: Married to Elisabeth van Culemborg (1475–1555)
Guillaume of Lalaing,Married to Jeanne of Crequy.
Yolande of Lalaing:married to Reinoud II van Brederode, lord of Vianen
Walraven II van Brederode
Jacques de Lalaing: Knight of the Golden Fleece.

Descendants of the 3rd Count of Hoogstraeten 

Antoine II de Lalaing, 3rd Count of Hoogstraeten(1533–1568) Married to Eleonore de Montmorency 
Guillaume de Lalaing, 4th Count of Hoogstraeten;married to Marie-Christine of Egmont, daughter of the Prince of Gavere.
Antoine III of Lalaing, 5th Count of Hoogstraeten;Married to Marguerite of Berlaymont - No children-
Charles de Lalaing, 6th Count of Hoogstraeten: Knight of the Golden Fleece and of Saint-James.Married to Alexandrine de Langlee. 
Albert-François de Lalaing, 7th Count of Hoogstraeten
Marie-Gabriel de Lalaing; 8th Countess of Hoogstraeten.
Philippe de Lalaing, Baron of Nevele; Canon at the Cathedral of Liège

Viscounts of Audenaerde 

This legitimated branch of the family descends from Antoine I de Lalaing. They resided between the 15th and 17th century in the House of Lalaing, Oudenaarde. It is believed to be the birthplace of Margaret of Parma.

Philip de Lalaing, Lord of La Mouilleriemarried to Florentia Rechem, Lady of Audenaerde.
Jacques I de Lalaing, 5th Viscount of Audenaerde ;married to Marie, lady of Enghien.
Philippe de Lalaing, 6th Viscount of Audenaerde;died without heirs.
Charles I de Lalaing, 7th Viscount of Audenaerde;married to Catherine de Fourneau. 
Ferry de Lalaing, 8th Viscount of Audenaerde;married to Marie-Anne van der Noot 
Jacques II de Lalaing, 9th Viscount of Audenaerde;married to Maria Therese Rym, granddaughter of Simon Rodriguez de Evora, 1st Baron of Rode.
Maximilien-Joseph, 1st count of Lalaing, 10th Viscount of Audenaerde;

Counts of Lalaing-Thildoncq 

Maximilien I Joseph, count de Lalaing, 10th Viscount of Audenaerde (+1756);married to Marie-Catherine de Larchier, Countess of Thildoncq
Charles II Joseph, count de Lalaing, 11th Viscount of Audenaerde and Count of Thildoncq,Married to Marie Camille de Beer.
Maximilien II Charles de Lalaing, 12th Viscount of Audenaerde, Count of Thildoncq;married to Anne-Marie de Draeck.
Charles III Joseph de Lalaing, 1st Baron of Arquennes, (1768-1816)married to Henriette de MaldeghemMaximilien III de Lalaing (1811-1881)
Charles Maximilien de Lalaing (1857-1919); diplomat.
Jacques de Lalaing; sculptor
Eugène-François de Lalaing d'Audenaerde ;Lord Chamberlain of the Archduchess.married to Agatha-Sohia de Espegrac.Annuaire de la noblesse de France et des maisons souveraines de l ..., Volume 11
Charles Eugène de Lalaing d'Audenarde; General; knight grand Cross of the Legion of Honour;married to Julienne, Countess Dupuy 

 Current head branch 
The current family moved back to Belgium.

Charles Maximilien de Lalaing (1857-1919); diplomat.
Jacques III de Lalaing (1889-1969); Secretary and ambassador of the King.
Josse de Lalaing (1927-)
Jacques IV de Lalaing (°1970);married to Laviana von Walburg Wolfegg und Waldsee.''
 Maximilian de Lalaing (1893-1894)
Isabella de Lalaing (1896-1929); married to Gustave de Mévius.

See also 
 Belgian nobility

References 

 
Seven Noble Houses of Brussels